Malupur is a village in Shahkot in Jalandhar district of Punjab, India. The village is administered by Sarpanch, an elected representative of the village.

Transport 
Shahkot Malisian station is the nearest train station.

References 

Villages in Jalandhar district